Lotus alpinus, common name alpine bird's-foot trefoil, is a species of legume in the family Fabaceae.

Description
It is a perennial herbaceous plant, 
typically sprawling horizontally at the height of the surrounding grassland or rocky surfaces. The base of its stem is woody. Flowers are pea flower-shaped and may be yellow, orange, or reddish. They bloom from May to August

Distribution
L. alpinus is a species of the mountain regions of the southern Europe (Austria, Germany, Switzerland, former Yugoslavia, Italy, France, and Spain), particularly the Alps and the Pyrenees.

Habitat

References
Pignatti S. - Flora d'Italia (3 voll.) - Edagricole - 1982
Biolib

External links
UK Wild Flowers
Luirig.altervista

alpinus
Plants described in 1825